The 2012 season was the Baltimore Ravens' 17th in the National Football League (NFL). While the Ravens failed to improve on their 12–4 record from 2011, they still managed to clinch the AFC North division title in Week 16 and finish the regular season with a 10–6 record, sending them to their fifth straight playoffs, where they advanced to the AFC Championship Game for the second consecutive season and third time in five years, and then to the Super Bowl for the first time since 2000. They won their second Super Bowl, 34–31 against the San Francisco 49ers. It was the first time in franchise history that the Ravens won consecutive division titles. This marks head coach John Harbaugh's fifth season as the head coach of the franchise and fifth consecutive post-season appearance. The Ravens played their home games at M&T Bank Stadium.

The Ravens dedicated their season to former owner and founder Art Modell, who died on September 6, 2012. On Week 1, all team members wore an "Art" decal on their helmets, and for the rest of their season, they wore an "Art" patch on the left side of their jerseys.

Ray Lewis, the last remaining member of the original Ravens roster from 1996 and the 2000 Super Bowl championship team, announced just after the regular season finale before the playoffs that he would be retiring after the conclusion of the season. Following three playoff matchups including a thrilling 38–35 double OT victory against the top-seeded Denver Broncos, his final game was a victory in Super Bowl XLVII. Lewis is believed by many to be the greatest Raven of all time and previously led the Ravens to Super Bowl XXXV in what was just their first playoff appearance in franchise history.

As of 2023, the only remaining member of the 2012 Baltimore Ravens that has yet to leave the team is kicker Justin Tucker.

Offseason

Roster changes

 Additions: S Sean Considine, CB Corey Graham, WR Jacoby Jones, DT Ryan McBean, DT Ma'ake Kemoeatu, S James Ihedigbo
 Losses: OLB Jarret Johnson, DE Cory Redding,  G Ben Grubbs, S Haruki Nakamura, S Tom Zbikowski, DT Brandon McKinney
 Re-signed Players: ILB Jameel McClain, ILB Brendon Ayanbadejo, RB Ray Rice (franchised), CB Lardarius Webb
 Releases: CB Domonique Foxworth, CB Chris Carr, WR Lee Evans, K Billy Cundiff

2012 draft class

Notes
  The team traded its first-round selection (#29) to the Minnesota Vikings in exchange for the #35 overall selection in the second round, as well as the Vikings' fourth-round selection (#98 overall).
  The team traded up from its original third-round selection (#91 overall) to the #84 overall selection, also giving the Atlanta Falcons their fifth-round pick (#164 overall).
  The team traded its original fourth-round selection (#124 overall) to the Buffalo Bills in exchange for wide receiver Lee Evans.
  Compensatory selection.

Personnel

Staff

Final roster

Schedule

Preseason

Regular season

Note: Intra-division opponents are in bold text.

Postseason

Standings

Division

Conference

Game summaries

Regular season

Week 1: vs. Cincinnati Bengals

The Ravens started their season at home against the Bengals.  They jumped out to a 3–0 lead in the first quarter with Justin Tucker's 46-yard field goal.  This was followed up by Ray Rice's 7-yard run to make the score 10–0.  The Bengals got on the board in the 2nd quarter with Mike Nugent's 34-yard field goal to shorten the lead to 10–3.  However, the Ravens were able to pull away as Joe Flacco found Anquan Boldin on a 34-yard touchdown pass to move ahead 17–3.  The Bengals responded coming within 7 when Benjarvus Green-Ellis ran for a 6-yard touchdown making the score 17–10 at halftime.  In the 3rd quarter, the Bengals were able to get within 4 points with Nugent kicking a 19-yard field goal shortening the Ravens' lead to 4 17–13.  However, the Ravens overpowered the Bengals scoring 27 unanswered points as Flacco found Dennis Pitta on a 10-yard pass to move ahead 24–13 followed up by Tucker scoring a 40-yard field goal moving them ahead 27–13.  This was followed by an Ed Reed interception that was returned 34 yards for a touchdown moving the team ahead 34–13.  In the 4th quarter, the Ravens scored again off of Rice's 1-yard run for a 41–13 lead and finished the game off of Tucker's 39-yard field goal to make the final score 44–13.

Ed Reed returned an interception for a 34-yard touchdown, making Reed the all-time leader in career interception return yards with 1,497. The previous record of 1,483 yards was held by Rod Woodson.

Week 2: at Philadelphia Eagles

For the first time in 5 years, head coach John Harbaugh made his first return to Philadelphia, where he served as the Eagles' special teams coordinator and defensive backs from 1998 to 2007, and was also part of the 2004 Eagles that made Super Bowl XXXIX. Baltimore took the lead in the second quarter and held it for most of the game, but with 1:57 remaining in the fourth quarter Michael Vick ran for a one-yard touchdown. With the surprising loss, the Ravens fell to 1–1.

Week 3: vs. New England Patriots

This game was played in the shadow of the death of wide receiver Torrey Smith's brother, who had died in a motorcycle crash the night before. The Ravens entered the game hoping to be able to avenge the AFC Championship loss of the previous season, which came at the hands of the Patriots.  New England started off fast as they drew to a 13–0 lead in the first quarter. However Baltimore scored 2 straight touchdowns to take the lead with 1:47 left to go in the half. Then Brady scored a touchdown right at the end of the half to retake the lead 20–14. The second half started off with a touchdown run by Ray Rice to put the Ravens on top 21–20. Then the Patriots retook the lead when Tom Brady scored a touchdown. After that the Baltimore defense began to step it up and held the Pats to a field goal. Then the momentum shifted as Baltimore scored a touchdown (Flacco to Torrey Smith). After forcing a Patriots punt, the Ravens drove down the field to score a field goal as time expired to win the game 31–30.

The Ravens avenged the AFC Championship loss and improved to 2–1 and continued their unbeaten record at home from the previous year along with continuing their streak of winning after a loss.

Based on Torrey Smith's performance through personal hardship, this game was ranked #9 on NFL.com's Top 20 NFL Games of 2012 as Showing Up. Smith finishes with six receptions for 127 yards and two touchdowns.

This game was also remembered for two controversial incidents. Late in the fourth quarter, with New England leading 30–28, coach John Harbaugh was penalized for unsportsmanlike conduct for coming out onto the field, which by NFL rules, is prohibited. However, Harbaugh was claiming that he was trying to only call a timeout to save time for his team. Since the NFL was using replacement refs at the time, and not the original refs, this was another controversial incident involving replacement refs. The penalty resulted in an irate Ravens crowd chanting "Bullshit" three separate times in just over a minute during the Patriots last drive, which was picked up by NBC microphones and was clearly audible during the broadcast. Play-by-play announcer Al Michaels said, "That's the loudest manure chant I've ever heard".

The other controversy is the winning field goal by Tucker. The ball, after it had been kicked, sailed over the top of the right upright. It was ruled "good", giving Baltimore the win. However, clear replays show that the ball was extremely close to sailing wide of the upright. Since field goals are not reviewable, the play could not be reviewed. Patriots coach Bill Belichick, as he was leaving the field, grabbed one of the officials, resulting in him being fined $50,000 by the NFL.

Week 4: vs. Cleveland Browns

After a scoreless first quarter, the Ravens scored first in the second quarter as Joe Flacco found Torrey Smith on an 18-yard touchdown pass (with a failed PAT) for a 6–0 lead. The team increased their lead as Justin Tucker made a 45-yard field goal to make the score 9–0. The Browns scored not long before halftime when Trent Richardson ran for a 2-yard touchdown, making the halftime score 9–7. After the break, the Ravens went right back to work as Flacco threw several completions to Anquan Boldin before scoring on a 1-yard touchdown run for a 16–7 lead. However, The Browns drew within 6 points as Phil Dawson nailed a 51-yard field goal, making the score 16–10. But then, the Ravens pulled away as Cary Williams picked off Weeden and returned the ball 63 yards for a touchdown, making the score 23–10. In the fourth quarter, the Browns tried to come back as Dawson nailed two field goals from 50 and 52 yards out making the score 23–13 and then 23–16, respectively. However, they were unable to tie the game on the their last drive with the game ending on a Brandon Weeden Hail Mary pass from the Baltimore 18-yard line, which was thrown too far and went out the back of the endzone. With their ninth straight win over the Browns, the Ravens improved to 3–1. The game was also the first of the NFL season to use NFL referees and not replacement ones following the officials lockout.

Week 5: at Kansas City Chiefs

The Ravens improved to 4–1 by winning a game that included six turnovers, four by Kansas City, and five total field goals by both teams. With the Bengals' loss to the Dolphins the Ravens moved into first place in the AFC North.

Week 6: vs. Dallas Cowboys

The Ravens survived a wild back and forth game in which they nearly lost an eight point lead in the final 45 seconds of the game. Following a Dallas touchdown and a failed two-point conversion with 0:36 left in the game, the Cowboys recovered the onside kick and got into field goal after a pass interference call on Chykie Brown put the ball in Baltimore territory. However, Cowboys kicker Dan Bailey missed a 51-yard field goal wide left with 0:02 left, preserving the win for Baltimore. With their fourth straight win, the Ravens improved to 5–1, and became 4–0 all-time against the Cowboys. This was also their 14th straight regular season home win.

However, Baltimore also lost Ray Lewis to a potentially season-ending triceps injury and Lardarius Webb with a season-ending ACL injury.

Week 7: at Houston Texans

Days before the game, the team was fined $20,000 for not adding Ed Reed to the injury report.

The Ravens drew first blood as Justin Tucker nailed a 51-yard field goal, but Connor Barwin sacked Joe Flacco in the end zone for a safety that started a string of 29 unanswered Houston points. Matt Schaub found Kevin Walter in the end zone on a 25-yard touchdown pass to take a 9–3 lead, and the Texans added on in the 2nd quarter with Johnathan Joseph returning an interception 52 yards for a touchdown. Schaub's one-yard pass to Owen Daniels and a pair of Shayne Graham field goals put the hosts up 29–3 at halftime.  The Ravens got right back to work in the 3rd quarter as Flacco connected with Tandon Doss on a 15-yard touchdown pass to cut the lead to 29–10, but the Texans pulled away as Arian Foster ran for two short scores, which were separated by a 54-yard Tucker field goal early in the fourth quarter.

It was the Ravens' first loss ever to the Texans in franchise history and first loss to a Houston NFL team since 1996.  The Ravens headed into their bye week 5–2 while also dropping their record to 5–1 against the Texans in the regular season and 6–1 against them overall.

Week 9: at Cleveland Browns

The Ravens broke out of a two quarter offensive slump, scoring 11 points in the final five minutes of the 4th quarter to complete a season sweep of the Browns for the fifth straight season. By winning their tenth straight game against the Browns, the Ravens improved to 6–2.

Week 10: vs. Oakland Raiders

The Ravens got their 15th straight home win (16 including playoffs) by defeating the Raiders. Baltimore set a franchise record for points in a game with 55 – improving on the previous record of 48 set against the Detroit Lions on December 13, 2009 – as the team improved to 7–2. (this mark would eventually be surpassed in Week 1 of the 2019 season when the Ravens scored 59 points on the Miami Dolphins. Jacoby Jones returned a kickoff for a 105-yard touchdown, making him the first player in league history to have two career kickoff returns of at least 105 yards. Jones had returned a kickoff 108 yards for a touchdown in Week 6 against the Cowboys.

Week 11: at Pittsburgh Steelers

The Ravens got their third straight win against the Steelers while picking up their 12th-straight regular season division rival win and improved to 8–2.

Week 12: at San Diego Chargers

The game went into overtime with a field goal by Tucker.  The field goal was set up by conversion of a 4th and 29 play where Joe Flacco completed a short pass to Ray Rice and Rice raced 29 yards on the ground for the first down, which would become the 2012 best play of the year as well as be given the nickname, "Hey Diddle-Diddle".  With the surprising win, the Ravens move into 9–2, getting revenge for the previous year's loss in San Diego on Sunday Night Football.

Week 13: vs. Pittsburgh Steelers

With third-string quarterback Charlie Batch at the helm, the Steelers handed the Ravens their first home loss since December 5, 2010 and the Ravens fell to 9–3.  This also snapped their 12-game winning streak over division rivals and 3-game winning streak over the Steelers.

Week 14: at Washington Redskins

With the loss to the Redskins the Ravens fell to 9–4 and 0–2 on the road against NFC East teams. Also, it was the first consecutive loss for the Ravens since Week 6 of their 2009 season.

The Ravens fired offensive coordinator Cam Cameron the next day, promoting Jim Caldwell to the position.

Week 15: vs. Denver Broncos

The Ravens were blown out at home, losing their third straight game and falling to 9–5. However, they clinched a playoff berth following the Steelers' loss to the Cowboys later in the evening. The Ravens later rematched and defeated the Broncos in the divisional round of the playoffs in a game known as the Mile High Miracle.

Week 16: vs. New York Giants

The Ravens used a dominant defensive and offensive performance to blow out the Giants. The Ravens led the time of the possession battle 39:21–20:39, had 533 total yards vs. the Giants 186, and went 11-18 on third down. With the win the Ravens not only improved to 10–5 but also clinched the AFC North division title (by having four wins in division games).

Week 17: at Cincinnati Bengals

The Ravens allowed their starters to come out for a few minutes in the first quarter, then played their second-string players for the rest of the game. With the loss to the Bengals, the Ravens finished the season 10–6.

Postseason

AFC Wild Card Playoffs: vs. #5 Indianapolis Colts

By winning the AFC North title, the Ravens hosted the Colts – a team that once played in Baltimore until moving to Indianapolis in 1984 – in the Wild Card round. This relocation remains a controversial issue. The Ravens had faced the Colts in the playoffs twice before, losing both times without scoring any touchdowns in divisional rounds: in 2006 and 2009.

The Ravens, with Ray Lewis playing in his final home game, limited the Colts to three field goals while Joe Flacco managed a pair of touchdown throws.
Colts head coach Chuck Pagano was a part of the Ravens' coaching staff from 2008 to 2011, serving as defensive coordinator during the 2011 season. Ravens offensive coordinator Jim Caldwell was the head coach of the Colts from 2009 to 2011.  Before the game, Colts offensive coordinator Bruce Arians was hospitalized with an illness.

The win also marked the first time in NFL history that a starting quarterback has won at least one playoff game in his first five seasons as Flacco's playoff record improved to 6–4 and the team's overall record improved to 11–6.

AFC Divisional Playoff Game: at #1 Denver Broncos

The Ravens faced the Denver Broncos for the second time in the playoffs, having defeated them 21–3 in the 2000 Wild Card playoffs, and also faced Peyton Manning for the third time in a playoff run.

The Broncos clawed to a 35–28 lead but had to punt back to the Ravens in the final two minutes.   In the signature play of the game—a deep touchdown strike by Joe Flacco to Jacoby Jones which has come to be known as the Mile High Miracle—the Ravens tied the game after facing a 3rd-and-3, and with only  :41 seconds left in the 4th quarter. After Baltimore tied the game, Manning and the Broncos took a controversial kneel down with 30-seconds left on the clock and two timeouts to take it to overtime. Later in the first overtime Manning was intercepted at his own 45-yard line, setting up the winning Ravens field goal in the opening minute of the second overtime. By improving to 1–2 against Manning in the playoffs, this was the Ravens' first victory against him since the 2001 season when he was with Indianapolis, along with their first-ever road victory against him. Synonymous with the biggest play of the game, this game goes down in Ravens lore as the Mile High Miracle. The victory improved their overall season record to 12–6.

AFC Championship: at #2 New England Patriots

The Ravens found themselves playing against the Patriots in the AFC Championship game for the second year in a row after losing to them in heartbreaking fashion by a score of 23–20 in the 2011 AFC Championship game.

With the comeback win after trailing in the first-half, the Ravens not only improved their overall record to 13–6, but also advanced to the Super Bowl for the first time in twelve years.

The Ravens were the last team to defeat the Patriots at Foxborough in the playoffs until the Tennessee Titans pulled off the feat 7 years later.

Super Bowl XLVII: vs. San Francisco 49ers

The Ravens advanced to their second Super Bowl in franchise history, facing the San Francisco 49ers. This would be the first time two brothers were head coaches of opposing teams in the Super Bowl with the 49ers being led by Jim Harbaugh, John Harbaugh's younger brother. The Ravens were designated the visiting team. After leading the entire game, the Ravens held on at the end, stopping the 49ers on four plays inside their own 10-yard line, then taking an intentional safety with four seconds remaining to milk the clock. During the 3rd quarter of the game, half of the power went out in the Superdome, leading to over a 30-minute delay in the game. They finished the season with an overall record of 14–6 with their 4–0 playoff run and improved to 2–0 in Super Bowl appearances, handing the 49ers their first Super Bowl loss as a franchise. The Ravens' win also marked the third-straight season in which a team seeded third or lower in its conference would defeat a top-seeded team from the other conference in a Super Bowl. With this win, the Ravens won their second Super Bowl, becoming one of two teams to appear in multiple Super Bowls without a defeat, along with the Tampa Bay Buccaneers.

Team owner Steve Bisciotti stated during a press conference that the Ravens Super Bowl ring for the 2012 season was going to be white gold instead of yellow gold, at the request of players and coaches. While offensive coordinator Cam Cameron was fired after a week 14 loss to the Washington Redskins, head coach John Harbaugh stated that Cameron deserved and received a Super Bowl ring.

Statistics

Team leaders

 stats values are correct through the end of the regular season. '

League rankings
 Total offense (YPG): 343.2 (19th) 
 Passing (YPG): 241 (15th)   
 Rushing (YPG): 102.4 (23rd)
 Total defense (YPG): 372.3 (25th)   
 Passing (YPG): 247 (23rd)   
 Rushing (YPG): 125.8 (23rd)

Stats correct through week 13.

References

External links
 
 The 2012 Baltimore Ravens
 2012 Baltimore Ravens season at ESPN

Baltimore
Baltimore Ravens seasons
AFC North championship seasons
American Football Conference championship seasons
Super Bowl champion seasons
Raven
2010s in Baltimore